Nailcruncher is a 1938 novel by the Swiss writer Albert Cohen. It is the second part in a loosely connected series of four; it was preceded by Solal of the Solals, and followed by Belle du Seigneur and Les Valeureux. Nailcruncher was adapted into a 1988 film with the same title, directed by Moshé Mizrahi.

See also
 1938 in literature
 Swiss literature

References

1938 novels
French-language novels
Novels by Albert Cohen
Swiss novels
Éditions Gallimard books